Multinational Centre of Excellence for Mountain Warfare (MN COEMW) is one of NATO Centres of Excellence, located in Bohinjska Bela, Slovenia. It is "responsible for training individuals and units for operation in the mountains and other terrains difficult to pass".

Currently Centre is not fully accredited; full accreditation is planned for 2015.

Overview 
MN COEMW is based on the Slovenian Military Mountain School, which was formed in 1996. In 2004 school was chosen as site of future COE.

On 15 November 2011 Slovenia (as a Framework nation) signed cooperation agreement with Austria, Hungary and Italy (as a Participating nations) regarding training of soldiers from these three countries in Bohinjska Bela; with this Centre was upgraded to multinational level. Also several other countries (Germany, Turkey, Canada and Croatia) are currently planning to apply for the membership.

Mission 
Primary mission of the Centre is "to support the transformation of the forces and assets of mountain warfare". The four core working areas are as follows: (1) education and training, (2) doctrine and concept development, (3) capability development and support to experimentation and (4) lessons identified and lessons learned processes.

Currently Centre provides following courses: Military Mountaineering, Combat Decision-Making in the Mountains, Small Unit Tactics in the Mountains, Surviving in the Mountains, Military Alpine Climbing, Military Mountain Rescue and Military Mountain Guiding.

See also 
 List of mountain warfare forces
 NATO Mountain Warfare Centre of Excellence
 Slovenian Armed Forces
 Army Mountain Warfare School (United States)
 Hatsavita Mountain Warfare Training Centre (Russian Federation)
 Isonzo Front

References

External links 
  Official Webpage
 Old Official Webpage

Military units and formations established in 2011
NATO agencies
Military installations of Slovenia
Mountain warfare training installations